Beth Chapman (1967–2019) was an American bounty hunter and reality TV star.

Beth Chapman may also refer to:
 Beth Nielsen Chapman (born 1958), American singer and songwriter
 Beth Nielsen Chapman (album), her eponymous second album from 1990
 Beth Chapman (politician) (born 1962), American politician, Secretary of State of Alabama